The India women's cricket team toured England to play the England women's cricket team in June and July 2021. On International Women's Day 2021, Jay Shah, the secretary of the Board of Control for Cricket in India (BCCI), stated that the India team would play a one-off Women's Test match against the England team. India women last played a Test match in November 2014, against South Africa. In April 2021, the England and Wales Cricket Board (ECB) confirmed the fixtures for the tour, including the one-off Test match, three Women's One Day International (WODI) and three Women's Twenty20 International (WT20I) matches.

A points-based system was used across all three formats of the tour, with four points for winning the Test match, two points if the Test was drawn, and two points for each win in the limited overs matches.

The one-off Test match ended in a draw, despite England making a big first-innings lead and enforcing the follow-on. England won the first WODI by eight wickets to record their 100th win at home in the format. England then won the second WODI match by five wickets, to win the series with a game to spare. India won the final WODI by four wickets, with England taking the series 2–1. England won the first WT20I, with India winning the second match. Therefore, England took an 8–6 lead in the points-based system into the final match of the tour. England won the third WT20I by eight wickets, to win the WT20I series 2–1 and to win 10–6 in the points-based system.

During the third WODI match, India's Mithali Raj became the leading run-scorer in women's international cricket. She went past Charlotte Edwards' previous record of 10,273 runs.

Background
Originally, the tour was scheduled to take place in June and July 2020. The tour was to consist of four WODIs and two WT20Is. However, on 24 April 2020, due to the COVID-19 pandemic, the ECB confirmed that no professional cricket would be played in England before 1 July 2020, with the tour being postponed. In May 2020, Clare Connor, the Director of Cricket for the ECB, suggested that India could take part in a tri-series with the touring South African team during September 2020. However, on 20 July 2020, reports stated that India would not tour, due to the impact of the pandemic in India.

The Test match was played on a used pitch from a men's game in the 2021 t20 Blast from the previous week. The ECB later apologised for the situation.

Squads

On 9 June 2021, England named a squad of 17 players for the one-off Test match. Two days later, Freya Davies and Sarah Glenn were released from the squad allowing them to play in the 2021 Rachael Heyhoe Flint Trophy ahead of England's one-day matches.

Only WTest

WODI series

1st WODI

2nd WODI

3rd WODI

WT20I series

1st WT20I

2nd WT20I

3rd WT20I

References

External links
 Series home at ESPN Cricinfo

Women's cricket tours of England
2020 in Indian cricket
2021 in Indian cricket
2020 in English cricket
2021 in English cricket
International cricket competitions in 2021
England 2021
cricket
2021 in women's cricket
Cricket events postponed due to the COVID-19 pandemic
Indian cricket tours of England